Littleton is a home rule municipality city located in Arapahoe, Douglas, and Jefferson counties, Colorado, United States. Littleton is the county seat of Arapahoe County and is a part of the Denver–Aurora–Lakewood, CO Metropolitan Statistical Area. The city population was 45,652 at the 2020 United States Census, ranking as the 20th most populous municipality in the State of Colorado.

History

The city of Littleton's history dates back to the 1859 Pike's Peak Gold Rush, which brought not only gold seekers, but merchants and farmers to the community. Richard Sullivan Little was an engineer from New Hampshire who made his way out West to work on irrigation systems. Little soon decided to settle in the area at present day Littleton and brought his wife Angeline out from the East in 1862. The Littles, along with many neighbors, built the Rough and Ready Flour Mill in 1867, which provided a solid economic base in the community. By 1890, the community had grown to 245 people and the residents voted to incorporate the Town of Littleton.

Littleton grew significantly throughout the 1950s and 1960s due to its proximity to Martin Marietta facilities, which produced the Titan rocket and other aerospace products.

Littleton twinned with Bega, Australia in 1961 as one of the earliest sister cities.

Littleton became widely known in 1999 when the Columbine High School massacre occurred, where two of the school's students, Eric Harris and Dylan Klebold, murdered 12 students and one teacher, injured 23 others and then killed themselves. News media wrongly reported that the incident happened in the city, because the school's ZIP code is primarily associated with Littleton. The school is actually located in adjacent Columbine, an unincorporated community, which is not a place name accepted by the U.S. Postal Service; by default, locations in ZIP code 80123 use “Littleton” in their mailing addresses. Columbine High School is in the Jefferson County school system and is not one of the Littleton Public Schools.

Geography

Littleton lies on the South Platte River in the Colorado Piedmont region of the Great Plains a few miles east of the Front Range of the Southern Rocky Mountains. Most of the city lies on the east side of the river. Several small tributaries of the river flow northwest through the city; from north to south, these include Big Dry Creek, Slaughterhouse Gulch, Lee Gulch, and Dad Clark Gulch. In addition, there are several small lakes and reservoirs located along the river in the southwestern part of the city. Immediately west of the river are Cooley Lake, Bufflehead Lake, South Platte Reservoir, Eaglewatch Lake, Redtail Lake, and Blackrock Lake. East of the river lie Wolhurst Lake and McLellen Reservoir which is fed and drained by Dad Clark Gulch. Chatfield Reservoir lies immediately southwest of the city.

As a suburb of Denver, Littleton is part of the Denver-Aurora metropolitan area and the Front Range Urban Corridor. It shares a border with Denver and Englewood on the north, Greenwood Village on the northeast, Centennial on the east, Highlands Ranch on the south, Columbine and Columbine Valley on the west, and Bow Mar on the northwest.

Unlike most county seats of suburban counties, Littleton is on the same house numbering grid, including its downtown, as the major city, in this case, Denver.

Climate

Demographics

As of the 2010 census, there were 41,737 people, 18,312 households, and 10,724 families residing in the city. The racial makeup of the city was 89.0% White, 2.2% Asian, 1.4% African American, 0.8% American Indian, 0.1% Pacific Islander, 3.9% from other races, and 2.6% from two or more races. Hispanics and Latinos of any race were 12.4% of the population.

There were 18,312 households, out of which 27.1% had children under the age of 18 living with them, 44.8% were married couples living together, 4.3% had a male householder with no wife present, 9.5% had a female householder with no husband present, and 41.4% were non-families. 34.7% of all households were made up of individuals, and 12.4% had someone living alone who was 65 years of age or older. The average household size was 2.25, and the average family size was 2.93.

The distribution of the population by age was 21.6% under the age of 18, 7.7% from 18 to 24, 25.6% from 25 to 44, 29.3% from 45 to 64, and 15.8% who were 65 years of age or older. The median age was 41.3 years. The gender makeup of the city was 48.3% male and 51.7% female.

The median income for a household in the city was $54,512, and the median income for a family was $74,744. Males had a median income of $52,674 versus $40,297 for females. The city's per capita income was $33,889. About 7.4% of families and 11.0% of the population were below the poverty line, including 13.8% of those under age 18 and 9.0% of those age 65 or over.

Economy
As of 2013, 66.8% of the population over the age of 16 was in the labor force. 0.1% was in the armed forces, and 66.7% was in the civilian labor force with 61.2% employed and 5.5% unemployed. The occupational composition of the employed civilian labor force was: 44.4% in management, business, science, and arts; 25.0% in sales and office occupations; 17.8% in service occupations; 6.6% in production, transportation, and material moving; 6.2% in natural resources, construction, and maintenance. The three industries employing the largest percentages of the working civilian labor force were: educational services, health care, and social assistance (20.1%); professional, scientific, and management, and administrative and waste management services (14.1%); retail trade (11.2%).

The cost of living in Littleton is average; compared to a U.S. average of 100, the cost of living index for the community is 101.8. As of 2013, the median home value in the city was $269,000, the median selected monthly owner cost was $1,668 for housing units with a mortgage and $470 for those without, and the median gross rent was $902.

Government

Littleton is a home-rule municipality with a council-manager form of government. The city council makes policy for the city and approves the annual city budget. The city manager implements the council's policies and oversees day-to-day administration of the city government and its departments.

The council consists of seven members - one member for each of the four legislative districts, two at-large members, and the mayor. Beginning in 2021, all council members are elected to 4-year terms. General elections for city council are held in odd-numbered years with either three or four council seats up for election. In 2021, Littleton voters elected the first popularly-elected mayor, Kyle Schlachter to a four-year term.

As the county seat, Littleton is the administrative center of Arapahoe County. The county government's main Administration Building is located in Littleton, and most county government departments base their operations in the city.

Littleton lies mostly within Colorado's 6th U.S. Congressional District, but changes made to Colorado's congressional districts in 2012 put the extreme southwestern portion of the city into Colorado's 1st congressional district. For the purposes of representation in the Colorado General Assembly, the city is located in the 26th and 30th districts of the Colorado Senate and the 3rd, 38th, and 43rd districts of the Colorado House of Representatives.

ZIP codes
The place name “Littleton” was assigned to eleven ZIP codes which cover a vast area west, east, and south of the city much larger than the city itself. This area includes the following unincorporated communities:
 Acres Green, Colorado
 Carriage Club, Colorado (since incorporated as a neighborhood of Lone Tree)
 Columbine, Colorado
 Heritage Hills, Colorado
 Highlands Ranch, Colorado (“Highlands Ranch” is also acceptable in place of “Littleton” in mailing addresses)
 Ken Caryl, Colorado
 Roxborough Park, Colorado

In addition, an extreme southwest portion of Denver, the Marston neighborhood, is located in a ZIP code (80123) with “Littleton” as the preferred place name for use in mailing addresses, though “Denver” is also acceptable. The Federal Correctional Institution, Englewood, also located in this ZIP code, is neither in Littleton nor Englewood, but in unincorporated Jefferson County.

Education

Primary and secondary education
The majority of the portion in Arapahoe County is in Littleton Public Schools. Small portions are in the Sheridan School District 2 and Englewood School District 1.

The small portion of Littleton in Jefferson County is within Jeffco Public Schools. The small portion of Littleton in Douglas County is within Douglas County School District RE-1.

Colleges and universities
 Arapahoe Community College
 Denver Seminary

The Colorado Center for the Blind, a skills training program for blind teenagers and adults operated by the National Federation of the Blind, is located in Littleton.

Infrastructure

Transportation
Since July 2000, Littleton has been served by the Regional Transportation District's light rail system.

Culture

Arts and music

The Depot Art Gallery and Littleton Fine Arts Guild
Littleton Symphony Orchestra
Voices West (fka Littleton Chorale)
Littleton Museum

Events
Western Welcome Week
Since the late 1920s, Littleton has celebrated Western Welcome Week - an annual community celebration in the greater Littleton area. Western Welcome Week started in the late 1920s, and has been held every year since. Western Welcome Week includes over 40 events benefiting dozens of local civic and charitable organizations.

Candlelight Walk
The Candlelight Walk is a Littleton tradition, featuring an evening of holiday festivities, culminating in the illumination of the trees on Main Street.

Twilight Criterium 
The Littleton Twilight Criterium occurs in the late summer in Historic Downtown Littleton on a 0.8-mile course. The event features famous athletes, concerts, and a cruiser ride for the general public.

Points of interest
 Hudson Gardens
 Town Hall Arts Center, providing professional theater to the surrounding metro area.
 The Littleton Museum
 Gravesite of Alferd Packer

Notable people

Composer, arranger and pianist Dave Grusin was born and raised in Littleton. He is the winner of an Academy Award and numerous Grammys.

South Park co-creator Matt Stone attended Heritage High School in Littleton, and aspects of the animated television show  are loosely based on the city. The show's series editor Thomas M. Vogt is also from Littleton.

Former Us Weekly and current Hollywood Reporter Editor-in-Chief Janice Min is from Littleton.

Several actors were born and raised in Littleton, including Emmy-nominated actress Molly Burnett from NBC's Days of Our Lives and Hollywood Heights star Cody Longo.

Actor Hayden Byerly, who plays Jude Jacob Adams Foster on the TV series The Fosters, was raised in Littleton until the age of ten.

Siblings Riker Lynch, Rydel Lynch, Rocky Lynch and Ross Lynch, who are best known as members of the pop-rock band R5, were born and raised in Littleton until they moved to Los Angeles in 2007.

Supergirl and Glee star Melissa Benoist was raised in Littleton.

Littleton is the present home of former San Francisco Giants pitcher Dave Dravecky and IFBB professional bodybuilder Heather Armbrust.

Other notable Littleton natives include metallurgist James M. Hyde.

Sister cities

 Bega, New South Wales, Australia

See also

Outline of Colorado
Index of Colorado-related articles
State of Colorado
Colorado cities and towns
Colorado municipalities
Colorado counties
Arapahoe County, Colorado
Jefferson County, Colorado
Douglas County, Colorado
Colorado metropolitan areas
Front Range Urban Corridor
North Central Colorado Urban Area
Denver-Aurora-Boulder, CO Combined Statistical Area
Denver-Aurora-Broomfield, CO Metropolitan Statistical Area

References

External links

 City of Littleton website
 CDOT map of the City of Littleton

 
County seats in Colorado
Populated places established in 1859
Cities in Colorado
Cities in Arapahoe County, Colorado
Cities in Jefferson County, Colorado
Cities in Douglas County, Colorado
1859 establishments in Kansas Territory